Endrit Shala  (born 2 December 1981 in Pristina, Kosovo) is a Kosovo politician. He is a member of the NISMA. Shala is considered to be Fatmir Limaj's right hand and close political partner.

After the Kosovo War of 1999, Shala became a member of the Democratic Party of Kosovo. Shala currently serves as the Minister of Trade and Industry in the government of the Relublic of Kosova.

References

1981 births
Living people
Politicians from Pristina
Kosovo Albanians
Democratic Party of Kosovo politicians
Shala (tribe)